John Patrick Doyle AM (born 9 March 1953) is an Australian actor, writer, radio presenter and comedian best known for his character Rampaging Roy Slaven.

Early life
Doyle was born in Lithgow, New South Wales in 1953 into a music-loving, Catholic household with three sisters, Deanna, Cathy, and Jen, and a brother, Tony. His mother was a business woman and his father a railway fettler. He was an altar boy for a time but lost interest in Catholicism with the introduction of contemporary changes in the Mass among other things. He attended and was a prefect at De La Salle Academy in Lithgow before graduating from the then Newcastle Teachers' College in 1973 with a Diploma of Teaching (Secondary English/History). He completed a Bachelor of Arts degree at the University of Newcastle (NSW) in 1978 before joining the Hunter Valley Theatre Company. Doyle continued to perform while teaching at Glendale High School near Newcastle. After seven years of teaching, he moved to Sydney, where he worked with the Sydney Theatre Company.

Career

Radio
Doyle began his radio career in 1985 when his character "Rampaging" Roy Slaven appeared on Triple J's breakfast show every Friday. Loosely based on classic TV sporting commentators such as Rex Mossop, Doyle created Slaven as a larger-than-life persona, an utterly opinionated, impossibly talented "sporting everyman" who has represented Australia in every field, won innumerable Melbourne Cups on his ageless mount Rooting King, is on intimate terms with every sporting celebrity (including many top racehorses), as well as film and music stars, politicians and other leaders of society around the world, yet who retains the "common touch" and stands for Australian manhood, fairness, and honesty. Slaven is the name of a well known family from Doyle's home town, Lithgow. During that time, he met Flinders University arts graduate and comedian Greig Pickhaver when they worked together as minor characters on the SBS children's series Five Times Dizzy. Pickhaver had similar comedic skills and interests, and had also developed a sporting commentator character called HG Nelson while appearing on the Melbourne radio comedy program Punter To Punter in the early '80s. An amalgam of just about every Aussie sports commentator and race caller who ever lived, HG, like Roy, has seen and done it all and is utterly passionate about truth and honesty in sport.

The team of "Roy and HG" was born when This Sporting Life premiered on Triple J in early 1986. The four-hour (later three-hour) comedy show, improvised live, soon became a cult hit. Over that time Doyle and Pickhaver perfected a unique style that satirises the world of sport and the athletes, the entertainment scene and celebrity in general, in a manner that is simultaneously ruthless and affectionate. As well as their weekly radio show, the duo also made satirical radio "calls" of major annual sporting events including the State of Origin series, the NRL and AFL Grand Finals (known as the Festivals of the Boot, Parts I and II) and the Melbourne Cup, as well as occasional outside broadcasts of TSL performed before live audiences.

In addition to This Sporting Life, Doyle hosted the two-hour mid-afternoon shift on ABC radio station 2BL in Sydney for several years in the late 1980s and early 1990s, earning a loyal following among listeners and demonstrating that he was not only extremely knowledgeable on a huge range of subjects, but was also a superb interviewer. He took over many existing program segments and made them entirely his own, and his regular conversations with guests such as cooking expert Barbara Lowery, Sydney Opera House media liaison officer "Commodore" David Brown (whom he nicknamed "The Salty Sea Dog"), gardening expert Angus Stewart (nicknamed "The Doctor Of The Dirt"), pop music expert and "Sydney Morning Herald" journalist Bruce Elder (nicknamed "The Professor of Pop") and Sydney Morning Herald TV Guide editor Tony Squires, became regular highlights of the show.

Like Graham Kennedy, Doyle specialised in subtly (or blatantly) undercutting the "straight" presentation of such stock segments, and he often veered off on tangents that he found funny or diverting, or introduced ideas which he thought might be likely to get a "rise" from his guest. One memorable thread was his long-running obsession with the source of a supposed "mystery noise" that was reputedly disturbing patrons in the Opera House Concert Hall, and he regularly badgered long-suffering Opera House publicist David Brown for an explanation. The inadequacy of the women's toilets were also a frequent subject of discussion, or more correctly, interrogation, and the "what's on at the Opera House" segments stretched from around 10 minutes to a whole half-hour, through most of which David Brown's characteristic laugh was a highlight.

Although his "Slavenesque" sense of humour often showed through on the 2BL shift, Doyle and Pickhaver were assiduous about keeping their real-life identities and the Roy and HG characters separate (they were rarely photographed) and although Pickhaver often appeared on The Afternoon Programme as HG Nelson, Doyle never performed overtly as Roy, or referred to him in any way. During this period Doyle kept up a hectic work schedule, presenting The Afternoon Programme two hours a day, Monday to Friday, as well as his regular four-hour stint on Saturdays on This Sporting Life and also, at one stage, the first weekly half-hour TV version of the show.

This Sporting Life was added to the National Film and Sound Archive's Sounds of Australia registry in 2013.

In March 2020, Doyle and Pickhaver reprised their roles as Roy Slaven and HG Nelson for their weekly show Bludging on the Blindside.

Television
In 1984, Doyle appeared as English bowler George "Gubby" Allen in the acclaimed Network Ten television miniseries Bodyline.

In the early 1990s, "Roy and HG" successfully transferred to ABC-TV; the first version, also called This Sporting Life, was moderately successful, but suffered from being essentially a TV "talking head" version of the radio show. They reinvented the concept by marrying it with a broad parody-cum-tribute of Australian variety entertainment. The result, Club Buggery ran for two series (one as The Channel Nine Show); it became a cult hit, and the duo won a Logie Award.

After moving to the commercial Seven Network in the late 1990s, they scored record TV ratings and gained international notoriety during the Sydney 2000 Olympics with their hit late-night Olympic commentary show The Dream. The show became so popular that the Australian Olympic Committee included the duo in the Closing Ceremony. They have also appeared on the Seven Network with The Monday Dump and  The Nation Dumps and have repeated their success with The Dream in two subsequent series commentating on the 2002 Winter Olympics in Salt Lake City and the 2004 Olympics in Athens. The two have also appeared together on the television shows The Channel Nine Show and Planet Norwich.

Over the last decade Doyle has also developed a very successful parallel career as a writer of serious television drama. His first major effort as a TV dramatist was the highly acclaimed ABC-TV miniseries Changi, an adventurous exploration of the experiences of a group of young Australian soldiers interned in Changi POW camp during World War II. The series was partly inspired by Hogan's Heroes and was originally conceived as a situation comedy; using the dramatic technique of magic realism, Doyle developed the script into a deeply moving yet often humorous examination of the experiences of young men at war and the effects it has on their later lives.

In 2003, he completed the drama series Marking Time, which examines contemporary racial and cultural tensions in Australian society, seen through the prism of an Australian country town and focusing on the relationship between two teenagers — an Anglo Celtic Australian boy named Hal and an Afghan refugee Muslim girl named Randa.

In 2006, Doyle appeared in Two Men In A Tinnie, a documentary of his own making involving a trip down the Murray-Darling river system of Australia with his longtime friend, biologist Dr. Tim Flannery. The program focuses on the degradation of the once mighty rivers and gives many different insights as to the causes. John and Tim reprised their collaboration in 2008 with Two In The Top End where they explored northern Australia and subsequently in 2012 with Two On The Great Divide where they travelled along the 3500 km long Great Dividing Range, and in 2014 with Two Men in China.

In 2013, he released Building Australia, a miniseries exploring the architecture and history of houses in Australia.

Theatre
In 2008, his play Pig Iron People was produced by Sydney Theatre Company  at the Sydney Opera House Drama Theatre. Another play written by John Doyle, Vere (Faith), produced by Sydney Theatre Company and the State Theatre Company of South Australia, was shown in October and November 2013.

Personal life
Doyle met his wife Deanna, a visual artist, while working with the Hunter Valley Theatre Company, though they both graduated from the Newcastle Teachers' College in 1973. The couple lives in the Sydney suburb of Balmain.

Doyle is the Patron of Autism Spectrum Australia; with his affiliation brought about as a result of his younger sister Jen being diagnosed with autism when she was ten. Doyle's late father suffered from dementia, which inspired his play Vere (Faith). Both of Doyle's parents died in 2012 and his sister Jen died in early 2020.

Honours
Doyle's outstanding contribution to Australia's cultural scene, through theatre, radio and television was recognised with the granting of an honorary Doctorate of Letters from the University of Newcastle in 2001. He delivered the 2005 Andrew Olle Media Lecture. He has also presented the AWGIE Awards a number of times, including in 2012 and 2015 as himself and in 2002 with Pickhaver as Rampaging Roy Slaven and HG Nelson.

Doyle became a Member of the Order of Australia on 14 June 2010 for service to the media as a presenter and entertainer, and as a supporter of a range of charitable organisations, particularly the United Nations Children's Fund in Australia.

|-
! scope="row" | 1981
| 
| City of Newcastle
| Newcastle Drama Award
| 
| Excellence in theatre
| 
|-
! scope="row" | 1989
| This Sporting Life
| AWGIE Awards
| Comedy - Any Medium
| 
| With Greig Pickhaver
| 
|-
! scope="row" | 1990
| This Sporting Life
| AWGIE Awards
| Comedy - Any Medium
| 
| With Greig Pickhaver
| 
|-
! scope="row" | 1991
| This Sporting Life
| AWGIE Awards
| Comedy - Any Medium
| 
| With Greig Pickhaver
| 
|-
! scope="row" | 1992
| This Sporting Life
| AWGIE Awards
| Comedy - Any Medium
| 
| With Greig Pickhaver
| 
|-
! scope="row" | 1993
| This Sporting Life
| AWGIE Awards
| Comedy 
| 
| With Greig Pickhaver
| 
|-
! scope="row" | 1995
| The World of An
| AWGIE Awards
| Comedy 
| 
| 
| 
|-
! scope="row" | 1996
| Club Buggery
| AWGIE Awards
| Comedy Revue/Sketch 
| 
| 
| 
|-
! scope="row" | 1998
| Club Buggery
| Logie Awards
| Most Outstanding Achievement in Comedy 
| Nominated
| With Greig Pickhaver
| 
|-
! scope="row" | 2001
| 
| AWGIE Awards
| Fred Parsons Award
| 
| With Greig Pickhaver
|
|-
! scope="row" | 2001
| The Dream
| Logie Awards
| Most Outstanding Comedy Program
| Nominated
| With Greig Pickhaver
| 
|-
! scope="row" | 2001
| Changi
| Australian Film Institute Awards
| Best Screenplay in a Television Drama
| Nominated
| 
| 
|-
! scope="row" | 2001
| Changi
| Australian Film Institute Awards
| Best Telefeature of Miniseries
| Nominated
| 
| 
|-
! scope="row" | 2002
| Changi
| Logie Awards
| Most Outstanding Mini Series or Telemovie
| 
| 
| 
|-
! scope="row" | 2002
| Changi episode Private Bill
| AWGIE Awards
| Miniseries (Original)
| 
| 
| 
|-
! scope="row" | 2002
| Changi episode Seeing is Believing
| AWGIE Awards
| Miniseries (Original)
| Nominated
| 
| 
|-
! scope="row" | 2004
| Marking Time
| Australian Film Institute Awards
| Best Screenplay in Television
| 
| 
| 
|-
! scope="row" | 2004
| Marking Time
| Australian Film Institute Awards
| Best Telefeature or Mini-Series
| 
| With John Edwards
| 
|-
! scope="row" | 2004
| Marking Time
| NSW Premier's Literary Awards
| Betty Roland Prize for Scriptwriting
| 
| 
| 
|-
! scope="row" | 2004
| Marking Time - episodes 1 & 2
| AWGIE Awards
| Television Award - Mini-Series (Original)
| 
| Episodes 3 & 4 were also nominated
| 
|-
! scope="row" | 2004
| Marking Time
| Logie Awards
| Most Outstanding Mini Series or Telemovie
| Nominated
| 
| 
|-
! scope="row" | 2004
| The Cream
| Logie Awards
| Most Popular Sports Program
| Nominated
| With Greig Pickhaver
| 
|-
! scope="row" | 2005
| The Dream in Athens
| Logie Awards
| Most Popular Sports Program
| Nominated
| With Greig Pickhaver
| 
|-
! scope="row" | 2006
| Two Men in a Tinnie
| SPAA Awards
| Best Documentary
| 
| 
| 
|-
! scope="row" | 2009
| Two in the Top End
| Logie Awards
| Most Outstanding Factual Program
| Nominated
| 
| 
|-
! scope="row" | 2013
| Vere (Faith)
| Sydney Theatre Awards
| Best New Australian Work
| Nominated
| 
|

Published works

References

External links

 

People from the Central Tablelands
Triple J announcers
University of Newcastle (Australia) alumni
1953 births
Living people
Members of the Order of Australia
Australian male comedians